The REME Museum is within the MoD Lyneham site, in Lyneham, Wiltshire, England, about  southwest of Swindon. The museum holds collections of technological and historical artefacts associated with the work of the Royal Electrical and Mechanical Engineers (REME), the corps of the British Army responsible for the maintenance, servicing and inspection of electrical and mechanical equipment.

History
The REME Museum started in 1958 in Arborfield, Berkshire, in two rooms of Moat House, the former commander's accommodation of the Arborfield Army Remount Service Depot. Over time the museum moved to a neighbouring building and expanded to allow more objects and vehicles to be displayed.

In April 2015, the museum closed in preparation for its relocation from Berkshire to MoD Lyneham as part of the Defence Technical Training Change Programme. The former Officers' Mess at Lyneham was modified to provide a new home for the museum. This allowed a complete refresh of the displays and layout, as well as providing upgraded facilities that are made available to the public. The new museum opened to the public in June 2017.

Collection
The following vehicles are on display:

Scammell Pioneer
FV434
Sherman BARV
Challenger Armoured Repair and Recovery Vehicle (CRARRV)
Westland Scout
FV106 Samson ARV
International Half Track
Morris Commercial
Churchill Tank ARV 
Western Star
Snow Trac

The museum is also the home to an extensive collection of military records. The museum building has a shop and a large café. An education suite with museum-led workshops is made available to schools and families. There are conferencing facilities and a reading room for researchers.

See also
 List of museums in Wiltshire

References

External links 

Army museums in England
Technology museums in the United Kingdom
Science museums in England
Museums in Wiltshire
Regimental museums in England
Royal Electrical and Mechanical Engineers